Wulfric or Wolfric is an Old English masculine given name, composed of wulf "wolf" and the suffix -ric "realm, power". In some English language contexts, Ulric is a derivative of Wulfric (although Ulric may also be a variant of Ulrich). Wulfric is a cognate of the Norse name Rikiwulf.

People
Wulfric Spot (died ), Earl of Mercia and Chief Councillor of State to King Ethelred
Wulfric of Haselbury ( - 1154), hermit and miracle worker

Fictional characters
The chief protagonist in Wulfric the Weapon Thane by Charles W. Whistler
The middle name of Albus Dumbledore, a main character in J. K. Rowling's Harry Potter series
Wulfric Bedwyn, Duke of Bewcastle, in Mary Balogh's Slightly series
Wulfric, one of the main characters in Outlander (film)
Wulfric, a main character in World Without End (Follett novel) by Ken Follett
Wulfric, the eighth and last Gym Leader to be challenged in Pokémon X and Y
Wulfric the Wild, a common-born ally of the King Alfred the Great, primary protagonist in Gary Whitta's novel Abomination
Wulfric, a rare blade awakened from the Beastly Core Crystal in Xenoblade Chronicles 2.